Ana Rocha de Sousa (born 25 October 1978) is a Portuguese director, screenwriter and actress.

Life and career 
Born in Lisbon, Rocha de Sousa graduated in Fine Arts of the University of Lisbon. She made her film debut in 1991, in João Botelho's No Dia dos Meus Anos, but became popular thanks to television, starting from her leading role in the 1997 RTP1 TV-series Riscos.  She then moved to London, where she studied direction at the London Film School.

As a director, after some shorts and a documentary about Adriano Correia de Oliveira, Rocha de Sousa made her feature film debut in 2020, with Listen; the film premiered into the Horizons section at the 77th edition of the Venice Film Festival, winning the Lion of the Future Luigi De Laurentiis Award for a Debut Film and the section's special jury prize.

References

External links
 

1978 births
Living people 
Portuguese screenwriters 
Portuguese film directors 
Portuguese film actresses
Portuguese stage actresses
Portuguese television actresses
Actresses from Lisbon
University of Lisbon alumni
Alumni of the London Film School